Olga Nikolaevna Yamshchikova  (1914–1982) was Soviet fighter pilot squadron commander during World War II who became a test pilot after the war; she has been credited with as many as three shootdowns in World War II. During her postwar aviation career she became the first woman to fly the MiG-19.

Awards 
 Order of the Red Banner of Labour (1960)
 Order of the Patriotic War 1st class (1947)
 Two Order of the Red Star (1943 and 1953)
 campaign and jubilee medals

See also
 Nina Rusakova
 Marina Popovich

References

1914 births
1983 deaths
Soviet women in World War II
Women air force personnel of the Soviet Union
Russian people of World War II
Soviet World War II pilots
Russian women aviators
Soviet test pilots